Loop 1 is a freeway which provides access to the west side of Austin in the U.S. state of Texas. It is named Mopac Expressway (or, according to some highway signs, Mopac Boulevard) after the Missouri Pacific Railroad (or "MoPac"). Local residents almost always use the name "MoPac" rather than calling the road by its number, which can cause much confusion, for few signs along the road use this name.

The original section of the highway was built in the 1970s along the right-of-way of the Missouri Pacific Railroad (now owned by Union Pacific), with the railroad tracks running in the highway median between West 8th Street and Northland Drive. To the north, the tracks run along the east side of newer sections of the highway from Northland Drive to Braker Lane.

History

Route designation
The first mention of Loop 1 in public record was in 1929. In 1944, the City of Austin Planning Commission (CMAC) proposed that the highway be built in parts of the under-utilized right of way owned by the MoPac Railroad. Thus, the highway was eventually given the nickname "MoPac" for its proximity to the railroad. The current Loop 1 was designated on October 27, 1967, from US 290 northward to Farm to Market Road 1325 (FM 1325). On October 24, 1985, the designation was extended southward from US 290 to SH 45.

Expressway construction (1969 to 2006)
This table contains the dates of the construction of segments of the road.

Route description

Loop 1's southern terminus is at the beginning of the State Highway 45 stub south of Austin. It passes through the Circle C Ranch housing development and the Edwards Aquifer and intersects SH 71/US 290 (Ben White Boulevard) and Loop 360 (Capital of Texas Highway). It crosses the Colorado River near downtown Austin; the view of the Texas State Capitol from the bridge became one of the Capitol View Corridors protected under state and local law from obstruction by tall buildings in 1983. North of the river, the highway runs parallel to the Balcones Fault and the Missouri-Pacific Railroad (Union Pacific) before it intersects US 183 (Research Boulevard) northwest of downtown.

Loop 1 is designated a scenic roadway by the City of Austin.

Major construction projects

Loop 1 Toll 
North of Parmer Lane, Loop 1 continues as a limited-access toll road to the SH 45 North/Loop 1 interchange, spanning . Frontage roads flank either side of the toll road to Merrilltown Drive.

The Texas Department of Transportation completed construction of the tollway as part of the 2002 Central Texas Turnpike Project (CTTP). SH 45 North, also part of the project, provides freeway access to Interstate 35 from Loop 1. The 2002 CTTP was scheduled to be completed in September 2007. However, certain sections of the project, including Loop 1 opened early and more than $100 million under budget.

If and when SH 45 is completed to the south of Austin between FM 1626 and I-35, Loop 1 will effectively serve as a full western loop to the city, being directly connected to SH 45 (and indirectly to I-35) at both ends.

MoPac Improvement Project

Since 1994, TxDOT has proposed the addition of managed lanes to portions of Loop 1. The MoPac Improvement Project was relaunched in July 2010 by the Central Texas Regional Mobility Authority (CTRMA). In December 2010, four alternative proposals were presented to the public, each of which would add one or more lanes; the "no-build" alternative was also presented.
The additions would not increase the right-of-way of the highway, but would be created by reducing the width of existing lanes and reducing and/or eliminating shoulders. An environmental study was completed in August 2012 with a Finding Of No Significant Impact and a recommendation of one new travel lane in each direction, operated as express lanes.
Construction began in 2013, and was originally scheduled for completion in September 2015, but by August 2016, the Central Texas Regional Mobility Authority announced further delays. The first of four tolled sections, specifically the northbound toll lane from RM 2222 to Parmer Lane, opened on October 17, 2016. The remainder of the northbound express lane, from Cesar Chavez Street to Parmer Lane, opened on October 7, 2017, and the entire southbound express lane opened on October 28, 2017.

MoPac Intersections Project
In 2013, CTRMA and TxDOT initiated an environmental study to analyze the best options to improve the MoPac intersections at Slaughter Lane and La Crosse Avenue. In December 2015, the study was completed with a Finding Of No Significant Impact for the project, which allowed it to move forward. The selected design included replacing the at-grade intersection at Slaughter Lane with a diverging diamond interchange (DDI) and the at-grade intersection at La Crosse Avenue with a diamond interchange. The project broke ground in January 2018 with Webber, LLC as the general contractor.

On August 10, 2018, the at-grade Slaughter Lane intersection was rerouted to the south as construction began on an overpass bridge on the original alignment. The completed DDI opened to traffic on November 11, 2018, with final completion occurring in Spring 2019. The La Crosse Avenue intersection began construction in Fall 2018. On March 29, 2019, the La Crosse Avenue at-grade intersection was closed for reconstruction as a bridge. The La Crosse Avenue bridge and intersection opened to traffic on April 16, 2020. The full project, including surrounding sound walls and retention ponds, was officially completed on December 16, 2020.

MoPac South 
In 2013, CTRMA and TxDOT initiated an environmental study of the MoPac corridor from Cesar Chavez Street to Slaughter Lane.  The environmental study identified the Express Lane(s) Alternative as the Recommended Build Alternative. In October 2015, six proposals were presented to the public, each of which would add one of more express lanes; the "no-build" alternative was also presented. In February 2016, the project was put on hold by a Save Our Springs lawsuit claiming the project had not complied with the National Environmental Policy Act's requirements for environmental studies. The lawsuit was settled on July 18, 2018 with a ruling in favor of CTRMA by the 5th Circuit U.S. Court of Appeals. However, the project was further delayed by a state moratorium on toll projects receiving funding from State Propositions 1 and 7. TxDOT gave CTRMA preliminary approval to resume planning for MoPac South in August 2019. In November 2021, the project was officially revitalized with a virtual open house, and it is currently in public planning phases with construction projected to start 2023.

Exit list

See also

References

External links

001
001
Freeways in Texas
Transportation in Austin, Texas
Transportation in Travis County, Texas
Transportation in Williamson County, Texas
Missouri Pacific Railroad